Abu Khattab al-Tunisi (died 10 June 2017) was a Tunisian jihadist and military leader of the Islamic State of Iraq and the Levant, who had risen to the group's third-highest ranking commander by 2017. In that year, he was put in charge of the military operations in eastern Raqqa, ISIL's proclaimed capital, which was attacked by the Syrian Democratic Forces on 6 June 2017. Just four days after the battle's beginning, Abu Khattab was killed at the frontlines in the Roman suburb, alongside 12 other ISIL militants, during a shootout with SDF fighters. His death was considered to be "a new blow to the ISIS terror group".

References

20th-century births
2017 deaths
Islamic State of Iraq and the Levant members
Military personnel killed in the Syrian civil war
Tunisian Islamists
Place of birth missing
Year of birth missing